The Massariaceae are a family of fungi in the order Pleosporales. It contains 3 genera and 33 species. Taxa in the family have a cosmopolitan distribution, but are better known in more temperate zones. Although the family is poorly known, it has been suggested that they are saprobic in wood and bark, with a few species being weak pathogens.

References

Pleosporales
Dothideomycetes families
Taxa described in 1869
Taxa named by Theodor Rudolph Joseph Nitschke